Manaus Energia is a Brazilian energy company operating in the Manaus area of Amazonas state. The company has its headquarters in Manaus.

References

Electric power companies of Brazil
Economy of Amazonas (Brazilian state)